"When We All Get to Heaven" is a popular Christian hymn.  The lyrics were written in 1898 by Eliza Hewitt and the melody by Mrs. J. G. (Emily) Wilson.  The two became acquainted at Methodist camp meetings in New Jersey. Hewitt was cousin to Edgar Page Stites, another well-known hymnist who wrote the lyrics to "Beulah Land."

References

1898 songs
19th-century hymns
American Christian hymns
Gospel songs
Public domain music